Doroshevich is the surname of:

 Mikhail Doroshevich
 Vlas Mikhailovich Doroshevich

Belarusian-language surnames
Russian-language surnames
Surnames of Belarusian origin